Edward Brown Ray Jr. (born April 5, 1947) is a former professional American football player who played running back for six seasons for the Boston Patriots, the San Diego Chargers, the Atlanta Falcons, and the Buffalo Bills.

1947 births
Living people
Sportspeople from Vicksburg, Mississippi
Players of American football from Mississippi
American football running backs
LSU Tigers football players
New England Patriots players
San Diego Chargers players
Atlanta Falcons players
Buffalo Bills players